The seventh and final season of NCIS: New Orleans an American police procedural drama television series, began airing on CBS on November 8, 2020. The season is produced by CBS Studios, with Christopher Silber and Jan Nash as showrunner and executive producer.

Cast and characters

Main
 Scott Bakula as Dwayne Cassius Pride, NCIS Southeast Field Office Supervisory Special Agent (SSA) and Team Leader
 Vanessa Ferlito as Tammy Gregorio, NCIS Special Agent
 Necar Zadegan as Hannah Khoury, NCIS Senior Agent, Pride's second in command
 Charles Michael Davis as Quentin Carter, NCIS Special Agent
 Rob Kerkovich as Sebastian Lund, NCIS Forensic Agent
 Daryl "Chill" Mitchell as Patton Plame, NCIS Computer Specialist
 C. C. H. Pounder as Loretta Wade, Jefferson Parish Medical Examiner
 Chelsea Field as Rita Devereaux, a United States Attorney based in Washington D.C. who is Pride's fiancé

Recurring
 Nidra Sous la Terre as Lydia Scarborough, NCIS Deputy Director
 Jason Alan Carvell as Jimmy Boyd, Dwayne's younger, previously unknown half-brother
 Amanda Warren as Zahra Taylor, Mayor of New Orleans
 Larry Mitchell as Donovan Blakely, NOPD Detective
 Tyler Weaks as Lenny Yates, NOPD Officer
 Callie Thorne as Sasha Broussard, old nemesis of Dwayne
 Drew Scheid as Connor Davenport, son of Sasha Broussard and Dwayne Pride
 Shanley Caswell as Laurel Pride, Dwayne's daughter by his ex-wife, Linda Pride.

Guest
 Erica Gimpel as Lynette Carter
 Maximiliano Hernández as Master-at-Arms Ted Yancy
 Justin Mortelliti as Sam Wilkes

Episodes

Production

Development
On May 6, 2020, NCIS: New Orleans was renewed for the seventh season. The season consisted of 16 episodes. On February 17, 2021, it was announced that season seven would serve as the series' final season. The series concluded on May 23, 2021.

Casting
It was announced on September 29, 2020, that Chelsea Field who had been recurring as Rita Deveraux had been promoted to series regular.

Filming
Production for the seventh season began on September 21, 2020 with full safety protocols in place amid the COVID-19 pandemic. Filming concluded on March 13, 2021.

Reception

Ratings

Broadcast
Seventh season of NCIS: New Orleans which premiered on November 8, 2020.

Home media

References

External links
 
 

07
2020 American television seasons
2021 American television seasons
Television productions postponed due to the COVID-19 pandemic
Television shows about the COVID-19 pandemic
COVID-19 pandemic in the United States in popular culture